Kyungbang ( Japanese:京紡/Keibō, Korean:경방) is a Korean chemical and textile company established in 1919, with headquarters Seoul, South Korea.  Its current CEO and chairman is Joon Kim.

The company was founded by Kim Seong-su (1891-1955) on October 5, 1919, during the Japanese Imperial Period, to assist in achieving national independence by helping create economic self-sufficiency for Korea.  Kim established it under the name Keijo Textile Corporation (京城紡織株式會社). The company changed its registered business name to the current name on July 14, 1970.

Sources

See also
Economy of South Korea
Chemical

External links
Kyungbang Homepage (in Korean & English)

Companies based in Seoul
Chemical companies of South Korea
Chemical companies established in 1919
1919 establishments in Korea
Economy of Korea under Japanese rule